Morris Steven Titanic (born January 7, 1953) is a Canadian former professional ice hockey player. He was selected 12th overall in the 1973 NHL Entry Draft by the Buffalo Sabres and played 19 games with them between 1974 and 1975. The Quebec Nordiques of the World Hockey Association drafted him in the 2nd round, 17th overall of the WHA Draft the same year, but he never played in that league.

Playing career
Titanic was born in Toronto, Ontario. As a youth, he played in the 1965 Quebec International Pee-Wee Hockey Tournament with the Toronto Faustina minor ice hockey team from. Titanic than played for the Sudbury Wolves during their inaugural season in the Ontario Hockey Association. He recorded 121 points during the 1972–73 season to become the first player from the Wolves to be drafted into the NHL. He was selected 12th overall by the Buffalo Sabres in the 1973 NHL Draft.

He posted no points in 19 career NHL games with the Sabres, but later distinguished himself with the International Hockey League's Milwaukee Admirals. A knee injury sunk Titanic's career during the 1979–80 season while he was playing for the Rochester Americans. In 2013 Titanic and nine other former NHL players sued the NHL and Gary Bettman over concussions suffered during the game.

Coaching career
After retiring, Titanic became the head coach of the Buffalo Jr. Sabres, where he coached players such as Bob Beers and Todd Krygier. Titanic currently is a permanent member of the Buffalo Sabres Alumni Hockey Team.

Career statistics

Regular season and playoffs

References

External links
 

1953 births
Living people
Buffalo Sabres draft picks
Buffalo Sabres players
Canadian ice hockey left wingers
Cincinnati Swords players
Hershey Bears players
Milwaukee Admirals (IHL) players
National Hockey League first-round draft picks
Niagara Falls Flyers players
Quebec Nordiques (WHA) draft picks
Rochester Americans players
Ice hockey people from Toronto
Sudbury Wolves players